The 2015–16 Olympique de Marseille season is the 66th professional season of the club since its creation in 1899 and 20th consecutive season in the top flight.

Players

French teams are limited to four players without EU citizenship. Hence, the squad list includes only the principal nationality of each player; several non-European players on the squad have dual citizenship with an EU country. Also, players from the ACP countries—countries in Africa, the Caribbean, and the Pacific that are signatories to the Cotonou Agreement—are not counted against non-EU quotas due to the Kolpak ruling.

Current squad

On loan

Transfers

Transfers in

Loans in

Transfers out

Loans out

Competitions

Ligue 1

League table

Results summary

Results by round

Matches

Coupe de France

Coupe de la Ligue

UEFA Europa League

Group stage

Knockout phase

Round of 32

Statistics

Goalscorers

References

Olympique de Marseille seasons
Marseille
Olympique de Marseille